Hjalti Einarsson (born 23 June 1938) is an Icelandic former handball player who competed in the 1972 Summer Olympics.

References

1938 births
Living people
Hjalti Einarsson
Hjalti Einarsson
Handball players at the 1972 Summer Olympics